Gräfe is a surname, and may refer to:
Albrecht von Graefe (ophthalmologist) (1828–1870), German oculist
Annah Graefe, late 20th- early 21st-century German folksinger
Eva-Maria Graefe, German mathematical physicist
Karl Ferdinand von Gräfe (1787–1840), German surgeon